Eduardo Marcelo Aguirre Biscaldi (born 25 August 1983) is an Argentine football midfielder who last played for C.D. Universidad de Concepción of the Primera B de Chile.

At age 12, Aguirre began playing in the youth ranks of Argentine club Rosario Central, where he worked his way up to the first team. On August 28, 2005, he made his official debut in the Argentine Primera División on a 4-0 victory over Lanús. However, that was the only official game he played for the canallas. In the winter of 2006, Bolivian side Oriente Petrolero signed Aguirre by recommendation of former player and Oriente idol Ronald Raldes, who knew him from his spell at Central. After four years with Oriente, Aguirre returned to Central on a loan; in hopes of helping the club win the promotion and regain a spot in first division football.

References

External links
 Argentine Primera statistics  
 
 BDFA profile 
 

1983 births
Living people
Sportspeople from Entre Ríos Province
Association football midfielders
Argentine expatriate footballers
Argentine footballers
Rosario Central footballers
Club Atlético Douglas Haig players
Oriente Petrolero players
Universidad de Concepción footballers
Primera B de Chile players
Argentine Primera División players
Expatriate footballers in Chile
Expatriate footballers in Bolivia
Argentine expatriate sportspeople in Chile
Argentine expatriate sportspeople in Bolivia